Johan Laursen (born 30 June 1980) is a Swedish former footballer who played as a midfielder.

References

1980 births
Living people
Association football midfielders
Swedish footballers
Allsvenskan players
Superettan players
Malmö FF players
Trelleborgs FF players